Greatest Hits is the first compilation album by American country music artist Patty Loveless. The album was released in 1993 shortly after Loveless left MCA for Epic Records and it contains 10 of her 12 top 20 hits on MCA Records. An accompanying VHS tape of music videos was released in conjunction with this album. The album was certified Gold for shipments of over 500,000 copies in the U.S.

Track listing

Chart performance

1993 greatest hits albums
Patty Loveless compilation albums
MCA Records compilation albums